Leicester Pride is an annual LGBT pride event in Leicester, England, which started to take place in 2001.

The launch project intended to involve the lesbian and gay community in the production of the Leicester Pride Carnival, to involve the whole community in the carnival itself and to promote better understanding. It was supported by Arts Council England.

The event is free, and starts with a parade from the city centre to Victoria Park.

Leicester Pride is an annual LGBT Pride event that takes place in the summer, and includes a parade through the city centre and a festival on Victoria Park, and then events running into the evening in the gay bars and clubs in Leicester.

Year by year
2007-8 No event.
5 September 2009 after a three-year absence, Leicester Pride returned to the city. Events included a march from the High Street outside the Highcross Shopping Centre, weaving around Leicester Market, past the Clock Tower, along Humberstone Gate and Lee Circus and finally emerging on Belgrave gate where a street festival involving the closure of that part of the road had been arranged. Stalls providing food, alcohol, LGBT and Pride-themed merchandise, as well as information stands for various sectors of the LGBT community (e.g. a bisexual stand) were present. Entertainment included live music, drag queen acts and DJs such as the Mix Munkies, with Blazing Squad providing the headline act.
2010 - Took place on Saturday 4 September 2010 on Victoria Park, which included a festival at Victoria Park until 8 pm, when the party retreated to the bars of Leicester.
2011 - Took place on Saturday 3 September 2011 with the parade starting at The Curve Theatre at 12 noon and ending on Victoria Park.  The party continued until 8 pm after which people headed to the after-pride parties at the various bars in the city.
2012 - Took place on Saturday 1 September on Victoria Park, the theme was "Masquerade".
2013 - Took place on Saturday 2 September kicking off with a rainbow parade.
2014 - Took place on Saturday 30 August with over 700 people starting the parade from The Curve Theatre at 12 noon to Victoria Park.
2015 - Took place on Saturday 5 September.
2016 - Took place on Saturday 3 September.
2017 - Took place on Saturday 2 September.

References

External links
Leicester Pride

Leicester
Pride parades in England
Culture in Leicestershire
Tourist attractions in Leicestershire